The IFSC Climbing World Youth Championships are the annual World Youth Championships for competition climbing organized by the International Federation of Sport Climbing (IFSC). The first competition was held in Basel, Switzerland in 1992. Bouldering was introduced at the 2015 championships.

Structure
There are three age groups:
 Juniors (18–19 years old), 
 Youth A (16–17 years old), 
 Youth B (14–15 years old).

Championships

Male results

Lead

Juniors

Youth A

Youth B

Speed

Juniors

Youth A

Youth B

Bouldering

Juniors

Youth A

Youth B

Combined

Juniors

Youth A

Youth B

Female results

Lead

Juniors

Youth A

Youth B

Speed

Juniors

Youth A

Youth B

Bouldering

Juniors

Youth A

Youth B

Combined

Juniors

Youth A

Youth B

References

External links 
 Calendar of IFSC competitions

Climbing competitions